Fort Apache is an unincorporated community in Navajo County, Arizona, United States. Fort Apache has a post office with ZIP code 85926.

Demographics

As of the census of 2010, there were 143 people, 46 households, and 36 families residing in Fort Apache.

Climate
This region has warm (but not hot) and dry summers, with no average monthly temperatures above . According to the Köppen Climate Classification system, Fort Apache has a warm-summer Mediterranean climate, abbreviated "Csb" on climate maps.

Transportation
The White Mountain Apache Tribe operates the Fort Apache Connection Transit, which provides local bus service.

See also
 Fort Apache (military post)

References

External links

Unincorporated communities in Navajo County, Arizona
Apache
Arizona placenames of Native American origin
Unincorporated communities in Arizona
White Mountain Apache Tribe